Ralph Clinton Dills (February 19, 1910 – May 23, 2002) was an American politician in the state of California. A Democrat, he served in the California State Assembly between the years of 1938 and 1949, and in California State Senate from 1966 to 1998. He is the longest serving member in the history of the General Assembly. He was born in Rosston, Texas and died in Rocklin, California.

References

External links
Join California Ralph C. Dills

Ralph C. Dills Papers

1910 births
2002 deaths
Democratic Party members of the California State Assembly
Democratic Party California state senators
20th-century American politicians
People from Cooke County, Texas
People from Rocklin, California
University of California, Los Angeles alumni
University of Southern California alumni
McGeorge School of Law alumni